Li Yang (born 28 February 1978) is a Chinese rower. He competed in the men's quadruple sculls event at the 2000 Summer Olympics.

References

1978 births
Living people
Chinese male rowers
Olympic rowers of China
Rowers at the 2000 Summer Olympics
Place of birth missing (living people)
Asian Games medalists in rowing
Rowers at the 1998 Asian Games
Asian Games gold medalists for China
Medalists at the 1998 Asian Games
20th-century Chinese people
21st-century Chinese people